Scomberomorini is a tribe of ray-finned saltwater bony fishes that is commonly known as the Spanish mackerels, seerfishes or seer fish. This tribe is a subset of the mackerel family (Scombridae) – a family that it shares with three sister tribes, the tunas, mackerels, and bonitos, and the butterfly kingfish. Scomberomorini comprises 21 species across three genera. They are pelagic fish, fast swimmers and predatory in nature, that fight vigorously when caught. Seer fishes are mainly caught using hooks and lines.

Taxonomy 
The following cladogram shows the most likely evolutionary relationships between the Spanish mackerels and the tunas, mackerels, bonitos, and the butterfly kingfish.

This tribe comprises 21 species in three genera:
 Acanthocybium (Gill, 1862)
 A. solandri (Cuvier, 1832), wahoo
 Grammatorcynus (Gill, 1862)
 G. bicarinatus (Quoy & Gaimard, 1825), shark mackerel
 G. bilineatus (Rüppell, 1836), double-lined mackerel
 Scomberomorus (Lacepède, 1801)
 S. brasiliensis Collette, Russo & Zavala-Camin, 1978, Serra Spanish mackerel
 S. cavalla (Cuvier, 1829), king mackerel
 S. commerson (Lacépède, 1800), narrow-barred Spanish mackerel
 S. concolor (Lockington, 1879), Monterrey Spanish mackerel
 S. guttatus (Bloch & Schneider, 1801), Indo-Pacific king mackerel
 S. koreanus (Kishinouye, 1915), Korean seerfish
 S. lineolatus (Cuvier, 1829), streaked seerfish
 S. maculatus (Mitchill, 1815), Atlantic Spanish mackerel
 S. multiradiatus Munro, 1964, Papuan seerfish
 S. munroi Collette & Russo, 1980, Australian spotted mackerel
 S. niphonius (Cuvier, 1832), Japanese Spanish mackerel
 S. plurilineatus Fourmanoir, 1966, Kanadi kingfish
 S. queenslandicus Munro, 1943, Queensland school mackerel
 S. regalis (Bloch, 1793), Cero mackerel
 S. semifasciatus (Macleay, 1883), broadbarred king mackerel
 S. sierra Jordan & Starks, 1895, Pacific sierra
 S. sinensis (Lacépède, 1800), Chinese seerfish
 S. tritor (Cuvier, 1832), West African Spanish mackerel

India
Spanish mackerel is very much liked for its delicacy in various regions of South India and Sri Lanka. In Tamil Nadu, this fish is called "Vanjaram" and is usually the most expensive fish available. In Kerala, it is called "Neymeen". It is called "Aiykoora" in northern Kerala and south coastal Karnataka. In Sri Lanka, it is known as "thora". Seerfishes are also referred to as "king mackerels" in some areas. They have very sharp teeth and are handled with care by fishers familiar with them. Seerfish is one of the more popular in this group for eating. Seerfishes are notorious for their histamine poisoning. It can be fried, grilled, and steamed. It is gaining popularity in the South Pacific and United States as a canned product. Also known as:
Tamil - Vanjaram,seela
Telugu - Vanjaram Chepa
Kannada - Konema, Kalagnani, Surmai
Tulu - Anjal
Malayalam - Neymeen, Aiykoora
Sinhala - Thora
Marathi - Surmai

See also  
 Bonito
 Mackerel
 Tuna
 Mackerel as food

References 

Scombridae